Leroy is a 2007 German comedy film directed by .

Cast 
  - Leroy
  - Eva
 Constantin von Jascheroff - Dimitrios 
 Günther Kaufmann - Leroy's father
  - Leroy's mother
  - Achmed
  - Hanno
  - Horst
 Afrob

References

External links 

2007 comedy films
2007 films
German comedy films
2000s German films